Seyit Alp Navruz is a Turkish actor and model.

Life and career 
Alp was born in Istanbul. He graduated Yıldız Technical University with a degree in Turkish Language and Literature. Navruz's interest in acting began at a young age. After being cast in roles on stage during his primary school years, he took acting lessons from Altan Erkekli and Cihan Ünal. Meanwhile, he continued his career as a model. He made his cinematic debut in 2015 with a leading role in Ceberrut. In 2016, he was cast in the TV series Aşk Laftan Anlamaz. In which he took a part as a side character with Hande Erçel and Burak Deniz as lead roles (Hayat and Murat) He became widely known for his role as Sinan Egemen in the Turkish TV drama "Fazilet Hanim ve kizlari" (Mrs.Fazilet and her daughters) which was broadcast by Star TV (2017-8). His first leading role on a TV series came with  his  role in TRT 1 series Elimi Bırakma as Cenk (Jenk) Çelen further contributed to his career.

In 2020 he began new series Zümrüduanka starring as Serhat Demirkan. On 15 June 2021, he starred as Poyraz Ali Özgür opposite Ayça Ayşin Turan in Star TV series ''Ada Masali

In 2022 and 2023 he acted in Yürek Çıkmazı with Irem Helvacioglu. He actes like halil.

Filmography

Television

Film

References

External links 
 
 

Male actors from Istanbul
Turkish male television actors
Turkish male film actors
Living people
Turkish male models
1990 births